Yiğitler

 Yiğitler, Çermik
 Yiğitler, Sason
 the Turkish name for Arsos, Larnaca